Cantus Verkehrsgesellschaft mbH (which translates roughly as Cantus Transport Company Ltd), based in Kassel is a joint subsidiary of Hessische Landesbahn (HLB) and Hamburger Hochbahn (HHA). The word cantus 
refers to a steel rail-wheel tyre and is written in all lower case in the company's style. The company took over local rail passenger services on four routes in December 2006 for ten years. After the re-tendering of the unchanged Northeast Hesse network on 15 June 2013 for 15 years from 11 December 2016, cantus was again awarded the contract on 24 March 2014. Since then, annual traffic of 3.9 million train-kilometres with 21 Stadler FLIRT electric multiple units has been operated.

 RB 5 Kassel – Melsungen – Bebra – Bad Hersfeld – Fulda (Frederick William Northern Railway, Bebra–Fulda railway)
 RB 6 Bebra – Herleshausen – Eisenach (Thuringian Railway)
 R 7 Göttingen – Eichenberg – Eschwege – Bebra (Bebra–Göttingen railway)
 RB 8 Göttingen  – Eichenberg – Hann. Münden – Kassel (Halle–Kassel railway)

Lines RB7 and RB8 are coupled between Göttingen and Eichenberg.

Line RB8 was designated as R1 until 2015.

Twenty 3-car and 4-car Stadler FLIRT EMUs were ordered and are used on all four lines. The 3-car vehicles can carry 343 (167 seated), the four-car vehicles 457 (219 seated). Three-car units are designated 427 (centre section: 827) and four-car units 428/828).

The vehicles were tested in November 2006 to test travels on the Friedberg-Hanau line of the HLB as well as the KBS 209.60 (operated by ODEG railway in which the HHA is involved). The HHA is also active in Hessen in the city bus services of Wiesbaden (WiBus) and Fulda (Fulda bus). In addition Cantus took part in the Bavarian subnetwork around Würzburg, which reaches Schlüchtern in a branch south of Fulda, but was subject to a competition procedure from DB Regio AG.

Network

References

External links
 official homepage
 list of vehicles (personal web site)

Private railway companies of Germany
Companies based in Hesse
Transport in Hesse